Zug 94 is a Swiss football team based in Zug, in the Canton of Zug which competes in the 1. Liga. It was formed in 1994 after a merger between SC Zug and FC Zug.

During the summer of 1983, Ottmar Hitzfeld signed his first coaching contract with the former SC Zug, at that time in the second tier of Swiss football. The team ended the 1983–84 season as Nationalliga B champions. Thus Hitzfeld and his team achieved immediate promotion to the Nationalliga A, for the first and only time in the clubs history.

Current squad

References

External links
Official website 
Soccerway profile 

Football clubs in Switzerland
Association football clubs established in 1994
Zug
1994 establishments in Switzerland